Roman Mykhailovych Kudlyk (May 4, 1941 Jaroslaw, Poland – January 21, 2019) was a Ukrainian poet and writing critic.

Early life and education
Kudlyk was born in a family of a serviceman. In 1945 he moved  to Drohobych. In 1958 he obtained his general education in Drohobych. In 1959 he enrolled in Lviv University and graduated in 1964.

Career
Kudlyk then obtained work as an electrician at the local oil refinery, newspaper and a magazine called October. He also worked also at the Lvivian TV-studio as the head of the literal department of the Lviv regional concert hall.

His writing was first published in 1957 by newspapers and magazines and then later in the collective volumes Apple bloom (1961) and Godspeed (1962).

He had been a member of the National Society of Writers (Ukraine) since 1965.

He was the author of the lyrics to Volodymyr Ivasiuk's songs, I am your wing («», 1972), «» (1978), «». His writings have been put to music in the songs of Ihor Bilozir («»), and Bohdan Yanivsky.

He wrote a libretto to several opera works of Bohdan Yanivsky,  «» (after the roman of Roman Ivanchuk  «»), Princess Frog «», Golden chatter «» (by Pavlo Tychyna), and musicals  «», Ring of Temptation «». 

He was the head of the magazine  and lived in Lviv, where he died on January 21, 2019. 

Some of his works were translated in several languages, including English, Bulgarian, Latvian, Russian, Romanian and French.

Publications
Conversation (Rozmova, 1963)
Springtime billyard (Vesniany bilyard, 1968)
Apple streetlamps (Yablunevi likhtari, 1979)
Leaves of a wild grape (Lystia dykoho vynohradu)(Horishnia brama, 1991)

References

1941 births
2019 deaths
Soviet male poets
Ukrainian male poets
20th-century male writers
20th-century Ukrainian poets
Ukrainian literary critics
People from Jarosław
Opera librettists